The Vilia is a  long left tributary of the river Prut in western Ukraine and northern Moldova. Its source is near the village of Buzovytsia (Dnistrovskyi Raion), Ukraine. After passing the village Lukachivka, it crosses the Moldovan border and continues south through the villages Cotiujeni, Berlinți, Beleavinți and Balasinești. It discharges into the Prut near the village Tețcani, on the border with Romania.

References

Rivers of Moldova
Rivers of Chernivtsi Oblast
Tributaries of the Prut